These are the list of routes in Iran.

Tehran Province

 Tehran-Qazvin Freeway
  Tehran-Shomal Freeway (under construction)
  Tehran-Saveh Freeway
  Tehran-Qom Freeway
  Tehran-Saveh Highway
  Tehran-Qom Highway
  Haraz Road  (Amol-Tehran)
  Sevad Kooh Road  (Sari-Tehran)

Mazandaran Province
  Coastal Road of Caspian Sea
  Chalus Road  (Karaj-Chalus) 
  Haraz Road  (Amol-Tehran)
  Sevad Kooh Road  (Sari-Tehran)
  Sari Damghan Road

Isfahan Province
  Tehran-Isfahan Highway
  Esfahan-KhorramAbad Esfahan-Yazd

Fars Province
  Isfahan-Shiraz Highway
  Shiraz-Kerman Shiraz-Ahvaz

Razavi Khorasan Province
 Road 22 Turkmenistan-Mashhad-Mazandaran
 Road 36 Bardaskan-Taybad
 Tehran Highway Tehran-Mashhad

Interprovince
  Tehran-Esfahan Freeway

Iranian Azerbaijan region
  Azerbaijan lake Bridge

First Level Roads

First Level Road Connection lines

Second Level Roads

Historical
 Royal Road
 Silk Road

Asian Highways

References
 Iran Road Maintenance & Transportation Organization
 Road management center of Iran
 Ministry of Roads & Urban Development of Iran 

Iran
Highways in Iran
Highways
Highways
Highways